Åbo Akademi University is the only exclusively Swedish language multi-faculty university in Finland (or anywhere outside Sweden). It is located mainly in Turku (Åbo is the Swedish name of the city) but has also activities in Vaasa. Åbo Akademi should not be confused with the Royal Academy of Åbo, which was founded in 1640, but moved to Helsinki after the Turku fire of 1827 and is today known as the University of Helsinki.

Åbo Akademi was founded by private donations in 1918 as the third university in Finland, both to let Turku again become a university town and because it was felt that the Swedish language was threatened at the University of Helsinki. The Finnish University of Turku was founded in 1920, also by private donations and for similar reasons. Åbo Akademi was a private institution until 1981, when it was turned into a public institution.

As the only uni-lingually Swedish multi-faculty university in the world outside Sweden and consequently the only one in Finland, Åbo Akademi University is responsible for higher education for a large proportion of the Swedish-speaking population. This role has many implications for education and research as well as for the social environment. As there are few students in most subjects, cooperation between faculties and with other universities is very important.

A minority of students are Finnish speakers who have passed a university entrance Swedish language test. While Turku itself is a bilingual city, the university provides a strong Swedish environment. Most of the students, regardless of their original language, will be functionally bilingual when finishing their studies.

Organisation 
The university consists of four faculties:
Faculty of Arts, Psychology and Theology (located in Turku)
Faculty of Education and Welfare Studies (located in Vaasa)
Faculty of Science and Engineering (located in Turku, with some activity also in Vaasa)
Faculty of Social Sciences, Business and Economics (located in Turku, with some activity also in Vaasa)

In addition, there are several other units and joint programs, such as:
 Language Centre
 Centre for Lifelong Learning
 Donner Institute for Research in Religious and Cultural History
 Institute of Human Rights
 Turku PET Centre (jointly run by Turku University, Åbo Akademi and the Turku University Hospital)
 Turku Centre for Computer Science (TUCS) (in co-operation with Turku University, among others)
 Turku Centre for Biotechnology (in co-operation with Turku University, among others)
 Vasa övningsskola, located in Vaasa, is the normal school of the teacher training programme.

While the university turned into a public institution, the foundation Stiftelsen för Åbo Akademi remained. Besides maintaining many of the university buildings, it is also a significant donor.

Rectors 
The following people have served as rectors of Åbo Akademi:

 1918–1921: Edvard Westermarck
 1921–1929: 
 1929–1936: Otto Andersson
 1936–1942: 
 1942–1950: 
 1950–1957: Lars Erik Taxell
 1957–1962: 
 1962–1966: 
 1966–1969: 
 1969–1975: 
 1975–1978: 
 1978–1982: 
 1982–1988: 
 1988–1997: 
 1997–2005: 
 2006–2014: 
 2015–2019: 
 2019–November 1st 2021: Moira von Wright
 2022-

See also 
 Education in Finland
 ESN vid Åbo Akademi r.f.
 List of modern universities in Europe (1801–1945)

References

External links 

Åbo Akademi University

 
Universities and colleges in Finland
Educational institutions established in 1918
Education in Turku
Forestry education
Finland Swedish
1918 establishments in Finland